Nantmor is a railway halt in North Wales serving the nearby hamlet of the same name. It had existed during the first period of the WHR, 1923–1936, and was rebuilt for the current line, opening on 27 May 2010.

History 

It was originally constructed as part of the Welsh Highland Railway and opened in 1923. In 1934 the Festiniog Railway Company assumed direct control of the WHR and renamed the station Aberglaslyn as part of an attempt to attract more passengers. The station closed in 1936 when passenger traffic on the historic railway ceased.

The original station had a corrugated iron building.

Present day 

Although there were plans for a halt serving Nantmor when the re-building of the WHR was proposed, they were dropped because of local objections. Subsequently, on 23 and 24 February 2007, a parish vote was held and by a large majority, (36 to 11) they agreed to ask for a halt to be located in the village. The plans were revived, and submitted to the Snowdonia National Park Authority on 18 July 2007.

Approval was granted on 6 December 2007. Construction was delayed until February 2010 due to a shortage of resources and work was completed by 16 March 2010. The rebuilding had been funded by the Welsh Highland Railway Society using funds donated in memory of one of its members.

References

External links
Video footage of Nantmor Station

Heritage railway stations in Gwynedd
Welsh Highland Railway
Railway stations in Great Britain opened in 1923
Railway stations in Great Britain closed in 1936
Railway stations in Great Britain opened in 2010
Beddgelert